The Alibori River is a river in the northeastern part of Benin. It rises near the village of Tobré in Atakora Department and flows northeast, ultimately emptying into the Niger River near Birni-Lafia. In Alibori Department it forms the eastern border of the communes of Banikoara and Karimama, as well the eastern boundary of W Transborder Park. The Pako River is one of its tributaries. It is populated with crocodiles.

References

Rivers of Benin
Tributaries of the Niger River